Samium ruled the ancient Near Eastern city-state of Larsa from 1912 BC to 1877 BC, according to the short chronology. He was an Amorite. He had a son called Zabaia.

See also

Chronology of the ancient Near East

Notes

External links

Amorite kings
20th-century BC Sumerian kings
19th-century BC Sumerian kings
19th-century BC deaths
Year of birth unknown
Kings of Larsa
19th-century BC people